Jim Sharp may refer to:

Jim Sharp (footballer) (1882–1945), Australian rules footballer
Jim Sharp (justice) (born 1952), justice of the First Texas Court of Appeals
Jim Sharp (bull rider) (born 1965), American hall of fame bull rider

See also
James Sharp (disambiguation)